Stansbury v. California, 511 U.S. 318 (1994), is a United States Supreme Court case in which the Court considered whether a police officer's subjective and undisclosed opinion whether a person who had been questioned was a suspect was relevant in determining whether that person had been in custody and thus entitled to the Miranda warnings. In a 9–0 ruling, the Court reversed and remanded the case. In a per curiam decision, the Court held that "an officer's subjective and undisclosed view concerning whether the person being interrogated is a suspect is irrelevant to the assessment [of] whether the person is in custody."

References

External links
 

1994 in United States case law
United States criminal case law
Miranda warning case law
United States Supreme Court cases of the Rehnquist Court
United States Supreme Court cases